Circinoniesslia is a genus of fungi within the Niessliaceae family. This is a monotypic genus, containing the single species Circinoniesslia nectriae.

References

External links
Circinoniesslia at Index Fungorum

Niessliaceae
Monotypic Sordariomycetes genera